Lobster Cove is a fishing village near Rocky Harbour, Newfoundland.

See also
List of lighthouses in Canada
 List of communities in Newfoundland and Labrador

References

External links
 Aids to Navigation Canadian Coast Guard

Ghost towns in Newfoundland and Labrador
Lighthouses in Newfoundland and Labrador